Events from the year 1779 in Denmark.

Incumbents
 Monarch – Christian VII
 Prime minister – Ove Høegh-Guldberg

Events

Undated

Culture

Music
 Johann Hartmann's music for Johannes Ewald's opera The Death of Vader (premiered 1778) is used for the first time.

Births
 6 March  Conrad Christian Bøhndel, painter and lithographer (died 1847)
 7 March  Conrad Christian Bøhndel, painter and lithographer  (died 1847)
 3 August  Peter Atke Castberg, physician (died 1823)
 4 April  Julius Høegh-Guldberg, officer and politician (died 1861)
 25 August  Andreas Schifter (died 1852)
 30 September  Johan Christian Conradi, German-Danish master builder and architect (born|1709)
 November 14 – Adam Oehlenschläger, poet (died 1850)

References

 
Years of the 18th century in Denmark
Denmark
Denmark
1770s in Denmark